Peter Rafael Dzibinski Debbins is an American convicted spy for Russia and a former military officer in the U.S. Army's Special Forces. In August 2020, he was arrested and charged with conspiracy to provide classified defense information to Russian intelligence services. Debbins pleaded guilty in federal court to one count of conspiracy to commit espionage on November 18, 2020.

Early life
Debbins' mother was Russian and was born in the Soviet Union. Reportedly, she was a survivor of the Holodomor. Debbins met and married his wife in Russia in 1997.

Education
In 1997, Debbins graduated from the University of Minnesota, where he was a member of the Reserve Officers' Training Corps.

In 2015, he graduated with a master's degree in Strategic and International Studies from The Institute of World Politics.

Military service
In July 1998, Debbins began his active service duty in the Army. From 1998 to 2005, he was deployed overseas in Korea, Germany, and Azerbaijan. During this time, Debbins joined the Special Forces at the behest of his Russian contacts and became a Captain.

In December 2005, he was honorably discharged.

He served in the United States Army's inactive reserve from 2005 until 2010.

Peter Debbins was an instructor with IWP's Cyber Intelligence Initiative.

Foreign recruitment
Debbins was first approached by Russian officers in December 1996. During this encounter, he told the officers that he was a "son of Russia."

In 1997, shortly after his college graduation, Debbins once again returned to Russia, where he was given the code name "Ikar Lesnikov".

In one meeting in 2003, Debbins accepted a bottle of Cognac and a Russian military uniform as payment.

In 2008, Debbins relayed his classified activities in the Special Forces to Russian agents and offered his former Special Forces colleagues' names for potential recruitment.

Every few years or so, up until at least 2011, Debbins would periodically visit Russia in order to meet with Russian intelligence officers.

Arrest
Debbins was arrested on August 21, 2020.

Conviction
On November 18, 2020, Debbins pleaded guilty in federal court in Alexandria, Virginia to one count of conspiracy to commit espionage, which carries a penalty of up to life in prison.

Sentencing
In May 2021, Debbins was sentenced to more than fifteen years in prison.

References

1975 births
Living people
American people of Russian descent
People from Minnesota
University of Minnesota alumni
United States Army officers
American people convicted of spying for Russia
Members of the United States Army Special Forces
Prisoners and detainees of the United States federal government